Greg Ernest Bellisari (born June 21, 1975) is a former American football linebacker in the National Football League who played for the Tampa Bay Buccaneers. He played college football for the Ohio State Buckeyes.

Oldest brother Greg was a linebacker and Captain at Ohio State while his younger brother Steve Bellisari was a quarterback at Ohio State.

Greg graduated from the Ohio State Medical School in 2005 and now practices as an orthopedic surgeon.

References

1975 births
Living people
American football linebackers
Tampa Bay Buccaneers players
Sportspeople from Boca Raton, Florida
Players of American football from Florida
Ohio State Buckeyes football players
Boca Raton Community High School alumni